Edwin M. Anzalone (born September 19, 1959), better known as Fireman Ed, is a well known fan of the New York Jets. One of the most well-known National Football League fans, he has risen to prominence by appearing on many local radio shows. He is known for leading the crowd in the team chant, "J-E-T-S, Jets!, Jets!, Jets!", which originally was led by two retired NYPD Jet fans – alternating from one end zone to the other end zone, in the upper deck only.
An actual New York City firefighter, Fireman Ed was injured on the job in 2007.
During the butt fumble game, a rout of the Jets by the New England Patriots on Thanksgiving night 2012, Anzalone left the game before halftime, stating that he would no longer lead cheers at Jet games as Fireman Ed. At the first game of the 2015 NFL season, Fireman Ed returned to lead cheers for the Jets.

Fandom
Anzalone wears Bruce Harper's jersey to games, however he switched to Mark Sanchez's jersey for the 2012 NFL season in support of the quarterback, and has been leading the J-E-T-S chant from Section 134 of the Meadowlands since 1986. He used to be hoisted up on the shoulders of his brother Frank, then later onto those of Bruce Gregor after Frank developed knee problems. In 1999, Fireman Ed was included in an exhibit at the Pro Football Hall of Fame as part of the Hall of Fans.

On September 25, 2009, Fireman Ed was given a game ball from the Jets Week 2 victory over the New England Patriots. On December 30, 2009, Cincinnati Bengals wide receiver Chad Johnson claimed he would imitate Fireman Ed if he scores a touchdown in his next game against the Jets, on January 3, 2010. The day after the Bengals' loss in Week 17, Johnson got in contact with Fireman Ed through Twitter and provided him with a VIP package for the Jets first round playoff game at Cincinnati, as a way to make up for the "trash-talking" that occurred before the game. Though he was appreciative of the offer he declined, on the moral ground that he did not think it was right to be flown out to the game by the opposing team. He did however say that if the Jets made him an offer he would take them up on it, though no offer was made.

On November 22, 2012, during a Thanksgiving night Jets blowout 49–19 loss to the New England Patriots, Ed left the game at halftime and deleted his Twitter account. He "retired" as the self-proclaimed mascot of the New York Jets, stating he will attend games but not in character.

On September 13, 2015, Fireman Ed returned in character at the Jets' home opener against the Cleveland Browns.

On September 8, 2019, Fireman Ed announced that he would return to leading the Jets Chant at home games.

Controversy
On August 16, 2010, during a Monday Night Football Giants vs. Jets pre-season game, Fireman Ed's inaugural Jets chant in the New Meadowlands Stadium was interrupted by a Giants fan who raised his Giants hat while Fireman Ed's fellow Jets fans stood by. Fireman Ed repeatedly shoved the fan before the fan was escorted away from Ed's chanting post. The Giants fan was later removed from the game. Fireman Ed was charged with simple assault for the incident, but the charges were later dropped.

Personal life
Anzalone grew up in College Point, New York.

Anzalone has also been a resident of East Rutherford, New Jersey.

See also
 The 7 Line Army
 Barrel Man
 Bleacher Creatures
 Chief Zee
 Crazy Ray
 Hogettes
 License Plate Guy
 Pinto Ron

References

External links

 Fireman Ed Radio interview

1959 births
New York City firefighters
New York Jets
Spectators of American football
Living people
American people of Italian descent
People from East Rutherford, New Jersey
People from Long Island